Miami Ice is the third full-length album by the experimental rock group Icy Demons.

Track listing
"Buffalo Bill"
"Miami Ice"
"1850"
"Summer Samba"
"Jantar Mantar"
"Who There"
"Spywatchers"
"Centuration"
"Realize It"
"Crittin' Down to Baba's"
"Getting Fat at Rico's"

References

External links
Impose Magazine Review
Official Site
Official MySpace Page

2008 albums
Icy Demons albums